Leslie Varis (born 13 May 1947) is an Australian cricketer. He played nineteen first-class matches for Western Australia between 1966/67 and 1972/73.

See also
 List of Western Australia first-class cricketers

References

External links
 

1947 births
Living people
Australian cricketers
Western Australia cricketers